ŽRK Kumanovo is a women's handball club from Kumanovo in North Macedonia. ŽRK Kumanovo competes in the Super Liga. They have won the Macedonian cup title in 2019. Next year they won the Macedonian Championship 2020.

History
Kumanovo always had a great handball team that competed on a very high level. They were always at top 4 teams during the decades since its establishment. They've won the first title back in 1980s. After many years of dominance of the Skopjes clubs in the league WHC Kumanovo broke through and won the cup title in 2019. Then they got the champions title after 40 years in season 2019-20. They've repeated this success in 2021 winning the double crown cup and championship. Kumanovo team also had significant  seasons in European competitions in the last 3 years.

Accomplishments

Domestic competitions 
 Champions
  :1981, 2020, 2021
 Macedonian Cup
 : 2019, 2021

Kumanovo Arena
Sports Hall Kumanovo  is an indoor sport venue located in Kumanovo, North Macedonia. The hall has capacity of 6,500 seats and was built in 1980.
It is the biggest indoor sport hall in Kumanovo, where competitions of basketball, indoor soccer, handball, volleyball and boxing matches  are held.

European competitions

Team

Current squad 
Squad for the 2022–23 season

External links
 EHF Club profile

Handball clubs in North Macedonia
Sport in Kumanovo